The 1956 Big Ten Conference Men's Golf Championship was held on May 25–26, 1956 in Wilmette, Illinois and Northwestern was the host school. The team champion was Purdue with a score of 1,501 and the individual champion was Joe Campbell of Purdue who shot a 281.

Team results

Individual results

Purdue
Joe Campbell won the Big Ten Conference individual title.

The top five player scores counted towards the championship.

Round summaries
The 1956 Big Ten Championship was played over two days with two 18-hole rounds played on each day, for a total of 72 holes.

First round
Friday, May 25, 1955

Second round
Friday, May 25, 1955

Third round 
Saturday, May 26, 1955

Final round 
Saturday, May 26, 1955

References

Big Ten Conference men's golf
Big Ten Conference Men's Golf Championship